Xanthophysa is a monotypic moth genus of the family Crambidae described by Eugene G. Munroe in 1964. It contains only one species, Xanthophysa psychialis, the xanthophysa moth, described by George Duryea Hulst in 1886. It is found in North America, where it has been recorded from Alabama, Florida, Illinois, Indiana, Kentucky, Maine, Mississippi, New Hampshire, New Jersey, North Carolina, Ohio, Ontario, Quebec, South Carolina and Tennessee.

The length of the forewings is 6–7 mm. The forewings have an orange ground colour with silvery-grey zigzag lines. Adults are on wing from March to October.

References

Glaphyriinae
Taxa named by Eugene G. Munroe
Crambidae genera
Monotypic moth genera